Liaqat Ali may refer to:

 Liaquat Ali Khan (1895–1951), the first Prime Minister of Pakistan
 Liaquat Ali Khan (Bir Uttom), a freedom fighter of 1971 Bangladesh Liberation War
 Liaqat Ali (cricketer) (born 1955), Pakistani Test cricketer
 Liaquat Ali (athlete) (born 1983), Pakistani athlete
 Liaquat Ali, better known as Liaquat Soldier, Pakistani actor
Maulvi Liaquat Ali (1817–1892), leader of the Indian Rebellion of 1857